The Valenzuela XUR Homes Realty Inc. is a professional basketball team in the Maharlika Pilipinas Basketball League. It is owned by the local government of Valenzuela City.

History

Team roster

Head coaches

All-time roster

 Rocky Acidre (2018–present)
 Mark Andaya (2018)
 Richard Alonzo (2018–present)
 Ryan Arambulo (2018–present)
 Iñigo Arellano (2018–present)
 RJ Argamino (2018–present)
 Krentz Carlos (2018–present)
 Adrian Celada (2018)
 Jericho De Guzman (2018–present)
 Jaymar Gimpayan (2018–present)
 Paolo Hubalde (2018–present)
 Jeff Javillonar (2018–present)
 Marlon Kalaw (2018–present)
 Mon Mabayo (2018)
 Julius Manalo (2018–present)
 JR Ongteco (2018)
 Henryford Ruaya (2018–present)
 Jomar Sollano (2018–present)

Season-by-season records
Records from the 2021 MPBL Invitational:

References

 
2017 establishments in the Philippines
Basketball teams established in 2017
Sports teams in Metro Manila